26th & Clark is a bus rapid transit station in Arlington, Virginia, located near the intersection of 23rd Street South and South Clark Street. The stop is on a mixed-traffic segment of the Metroway that is restricted to buses during certain hours. It provides southbound service to central Crystal City.

History 
26th & Clark opened to the public as one of the original Metroway stations; the station opened for service on August 24, 2014.

The station was upgraded on April 17, 2016, along with the Arlington portion of the Transitway.

References

External links
 Official Metroway site

Buildings and structures in Arlington, Virginia
Metroway
2014 establishments in Virginia
Transport infrastructure completed in 2014
Bus stations in Virginia
Crystal City, Arlington, Virginia